Matisia grandifolia, the molinillo, is a species of flowering plant in the family Malvaceae sensu lato or Bombacaceae. It is found only in Ecuador. Its natural habitats are subtropical or tropical moist lowland forests and subtropical or tropical moist montane forests. It is threatened by habitat loss.

References

grandifolia
grand
Endangered plants
Endangered biota of South America
Taxonomy articles created by Polbot